Solebay may refer to:

 Battle of Solebay, a naval battle of the Third Anglo-Dutch War in 1672
 HMS Solebay, any of seven ships of the Royal Navy
 Adnams Brewery, in Southwold, Suffolk, England, known as Sole Bay Brewery before it was purchased in 1872 by George and Ernest Adnams